Willem van der Steen (9 November 1905 – 10 March 1983) was a Dutch long-distance runner. He competed in the marathon at the 1928 Summer Olympics.

References

External links
 

1905 births
1983 deaths
Athletes (track and field) at the 1928 Summer Olympics
Dutch male long-distance runners
Dutch male marathon runners
Olympic athletes of the Netherlands
Athletes from Amsterdam